In mathematics, the Kolmogorov extension theorem (also known as Kolmogorov existence theorem, the Kolmogorov consistency theorem or the Daniell-Kolmogorov theorem) is a theorem that guarantees that a suitably "consistent" collection of finite-dimensional distributions will define a stochastic process. It is credited to the English mathematician Percy John Daniell and the Russian mathematician Andrey Nikolaevich Kolmogorov.

Statement of the theorem

Let  denote some interval (thought of as "time"), and let . Suppose that these measures satisfy two consistency conditions:

2. for all measurable sets ,

Then there exists a probability space  and a stochastic process  such that

for all ,  and measurable sets , i.e.  has  as its finite-dimensional distributions relative to times .

In fact, it is always possible to take as the underlying probability space  and to take for  the canonical process . Kolmogorov's extension theorem applies when  is uncountable, but the price to pay

Explanation of the conditions

The two conditions required by the theorem are trivially satisfied by any stochastic process. For example, consider a real-valued discrete-time stochastic process . Hence, for the finite-dimensional distributions to be consistent, it must hold that
.
The first condition generalizes this statement to hold for any number of time points , and any control sets .

Continuing the example, the second condition implies that . Also this is a trivial condition that will be satisfied by any consistent family of finite-dimensional distributions.

Implications of the theorem

Since the two conditions are trivially satisfied for any stochastic process, the power of the theorem is that no other conditions are required: For any reasonable (i.e., consistent) family of finite-dimensional distributions, there exists a stochastic process with these distributions.

The measure-theoretic approach to stochastic processes starts with a probability space and defines a stochastic process as a family of functions on this probability space. However, in many applications the starting point is really the finite-dimensional distributions of the stochastic process. The theorem says that provided the finite-dimensional distributions satisfy the obvious consistency requirements, one can always identify a probability space to match the purpose. In many situations, this means that one does not have to be explicit about what the probability space is. Many texts on stochastic processes do, indeed, assume a probability space but never state explicitly what it is.

The theorem is used in one of the standard proofs of existence of a Brownian motion, by specifying the finite dimensional distributions to be Gaussian random variables, satisfying the consistency conditions above. As in most of the definitions of Brownian motion it is required that the sample paths are continuous almost surely, and one then uses the Kolmogorov continuity theorem to construct a continuous modification of the process constructed by the Kolmogorov extension theorem.

General form of the theorem
The Kolmogorov extension theorem gives us conditions for a collection of measures on Euclidean spaces to be the finite-dimensional distributions of some -valued stochastic process, but the assumption that the state space be  is unnecessary. In fact, any collection of measurable spaces together with a collection of inner regular measures defined on the finite products of these spaces would suffice, provided that these measures satisfy a certain compatibility relation. The formal statement of the general theorem is as follows.

Let  be any set. For each finite subset , define

.

For subsets , let  denote the canonical projection map .

Suppose also that this collection  of measures satisfies the following compatibility relation: for finite subsets , we have that

where  denotes the pushforward measure of  induced by the canonical projection map .

Then there exists a unique probability measure  on  such that  for every finite subset .

As a remark, all of the measures  are defined on the product sigma algebra on their respective spaces, which (as mentioned before) is rather coarse. The measure  may sometimes be extended appropriately to a larger sigma algebra, if there is additional structure involved.

The reason that the original statement of the theorem does not mention inner regularity of the measures  is that this would automatically follow, since Borel probability measures on Polish spaces are automatically Radon.

This theorem has many far-reaching consequences; for example it can be used to prove the existence of the following, among others:

Brownian motion, i.e., the Wiener process,
a Markov chain taking values in a given state space with a given transition matrix,
infinite products of (inner-regular) probability spaces.

History

According to John Aldrich, the theorem was independently discovered by British mathematician Percy John Daniell in the slightly different setting of integration theory.

References

External links
 Aldrich, J. (2007) "But you have to remember P.J.Daniell of Sheffield" Electronic Journ@l for History of Probability and Statistics December 2007.

Theorems regarding stochastic processes